Around the City is the seventeenth studio album by Brazilian jazz pianist and singer Eliane Elias. It was released on August 22, 2006 by RCA Victor. The track list below is for the European release, which is different from that in the US.

Recording locations
The recording locations for this album were: Avatar Studios, New York; Chez Elias, New York; Fun Machine; Henson Recording Studios, Hollywood; The Magic Shop, New York; and Westlake Audio, Hollywood.

Reception
Patrick Ambrose of The Morning News stated, " In her latest album, Around the City, Elias shows signs she is making the radical change many great artists experience at some point in their careers. With this collection of cover songs and vignettes about city life, Elias has blended the spontaneity of acoustic improvisation with the sculpted perfectionism of the urban-contemporary soundscape." Bridget A. Arnwine of All About Jazz commented, "Elias is creative in her approach on Around the City, where she uses the music to illustrate how the makeup of a city can be a metaphor for life. These songs represent perseverance and forgiveness, fun times and celebration, and love—just as cities include business districts, working-class neighborhoods and all-night party spots."

Track listing

Chart positions

References

External links

2004 albums
Eliane Elias albums